Helema Williams (born 11 October 1991 in Tauhunu, Cook Islands) is a Cook Islander sailor. She competed at the 2012 Summer Olympics in the Laser Radial class event where she finished last. She was the flag bearer for the Cook Islands during the opening ceremony.

References

External links
 

1991 births
Living people
Sailors at the 2012 Summer Olympics – Laser Radial
Olympic sailors of the Cook Islands
Cook Island female sailors (sport)
People from Manihiki